Pohjanheimo is a surname. Notable people with the surname include:

Erkki Pohjanheimo (born 1942), Finnish television producer and director
Hjalmar V. Pohjanheimo (1867–1936), Finnish film director
Mervi Pohjanheimo (born 1945), Finnish producer and director